Maneepat Myra Molloy (born 18 September 1997), nicknamed Myra (ไมร่า), is a Thai-Chinese/American singer, songwriter and actress. In 2011 at age 13, Molloy won the premier season of Thailand's Got Talent with her performances of a combination of cross-over classical and Broadway songs. In August 2014 at age 16, she placed Top 6 on ABC television's Rising Star USA. In 2018-2019 Molloy played Kim (alternate) in the US tour of Miss Saigon. Molloy played 'Quinn' in Miramax's He's All That, the gender reversing reboot of She's All That.

Background 
Molloy was born in Bangkok to a Thai-Chinese mother and an American father. She has a younger sister, Nina. From an early age, Molloy made frequent trips to New York City, where she fell in love with Broadway. She was fascinated by The Phantom of the Opera, more than once standing through the entire performance with her $26 standing-room ticket. She still tries to attend every musical that she possibly can.

Molloy started playing violin when she was 5, later switching to the viola. She was a member of her school orchestra, as well as senior and chamber choirs. Molloy was the first vocal scholar at Shrewsbury International School Bangkok at age 9.

In 2011 when Molloy was 13, she entered the first season of Thailand's Got Talent. In the competition she sang Time to Say Goodbye, Think of Me, Pie Jesu, and the Thai pop song "Star". The founder of Bangkok Grand Opera said he opened his new production company based on the increased interest in Western classical music as a direct result of Molloy's performances.

Since winning the competition in 2011, Molloy has performed regularly with the Siam Sinfonietta Orchestra and Bangkok Opera. She regularly sings at major events including The Thai National Film Awards, The British Embassy Celebration of Queen Elizabeth II's birthday, The Asia-Pacific ICT Awards, numerous music festivals and concerts, and regularly at corporate events for major international companies including Rolls-Royce, Samsung, Johnson & Johnson, Shiseido and many more.

Molloy has performed in Paris, China, Singapore, Thailand, and the United States singing in different languages including English, Thai, Chinese, German, French, Italian, Spanish and Latin. She enjoys singing classical, pop, musicals and Jazz.

In 2012 she landed her first major theatrical role, playing the young Reya in Reya the Musical, based on a popular work of Thai fiction by Thaithow Sucharitkul, music by Somtow Sucharitkul. Every performance of the musical sold out.

In late 2012, Molloy sang from the audience at a David Foster concert in Bangkok, impressing him with her clear soprano voice. Later in the concert David invited Molloy on stage to sing a duet with tenor Fernando Varela. David auspiciously commented, "I'm sure I will be seeing a lot more of you." Then in April 2013 David invited Molloy to perform with him in Malibu, California USA at the 65th anniversary of Israel.

Molloy placed sixth in Season 1 of Rising Star on August 17, 2014, at age 16.

In 2016 Molloy played the character Wish in HBO Asia's original series Halfworlds II. She also co-wrote and performed several songs for the series. In November 2016, Molloy performed the songs and voice of Moana in the Thai version of the Walt Disney Studios animated film.

Molloy graduated summa cum laude from Berklee College of Music in Boston Massachusetts, majoring in singing and songwriting. She was a merit scholarship student.

Molloy is Kim (Alternate) in the 2018-19 US Tour of "Miss Saigon".

(2021)Myra is Quinn in movie "He's All That" on Netflix.

Rising Star

Work

Movies and television 
 2021
 Quinn He's All That a Netflix feature film.
 2020
 Mara Chamberlain, The Bold Type
 2016
 The Thai dub of Moana, a Walt Disney Studios animated feature film 
 Halfworlds II, an HBO Asia original series
 2014
 Final 6 on Rising Star.
 2011
 The Winner Thailand's Got Talent

Theater and opera 
 2018-2019 Kim (alternate), Miss Saigon US national tour
 2016 Dracula, Blood is Life. Molloy played Lucy in the Bangkok theatrical production.
 2016 The 33 Gods, an opera by Somtow Sucharitkul.
 2012 Molloy as the young Reya in Reya the Musical. The play is based on the book by famed Thai writer Thaitao Sucharitkul. Music by Somtow Sucharitkul.
 2012 Molloy as Tiger in "A Boy and a Tiger" by Bruce Gaston at Impact Arena
 2006 Molloy sang in the children's choir in the Bangkok Opera production of Ayodhya by Somtow Sucharitkul

Recordings 
 2016: How Far I'll Go (Thai version) on Walt Disney Records
 2016: Blood Is Life on Ewing Entertainment
 2015: Could It Be You on Chillin' Groove Records
 2014: Time to Say Goodbye on Capitol Records, USA
 2014: Gravity on Capitol Records, USA
 2014: Stars on Capitol Records, USA
 2014: Your Song on Capitol Records, USA
 2014: Chandelier on Capitol Records, USA
 2012: Why Can't I Dream from Reya The Musical
 2011: Serment au Clair de Lune from the concert A Tout Jamais, a collection of H.M. The King of Thailand's songs translated into French.

Awards 

 2014 Top 6 in America's ABC "Rising Star"
 2011 Winner premier season Thailand's Got Talent
 2008 First prize trophy from HRH The Thai Pricness Future Park Junior Talent Award 2008
 2008 Winner Dutchmill Kids Star Talent Contest 2008
 2008 Winner Fairbairn Exhibition Scholarship (Shrewsbury International School)
 2007 Winner Nescafe My Cup Fantasia 2
 2006 Winner MIFA Singing Contest 2006 (at age 8)

References

External links 
 

Myra Molloy
Participants in American reality television series
Myra Molloy
Myra Molloy
Myra Molloy
Singers from Los Angeles
Myra Molloy
Italian-language singers
1997 births
Living people
21st-century American women singers
21st-century American singers